Cora Stephan (born 7 April 1951 in Strang Bad Rothenfelde, West Germany) is a German-speaking writer and essayist.

As an author of crime fiction she is known under the pseudonym Anne Chaplet.

Stephan grew up in Osnabrück (Germany). Having studied in Hamburg and Frankfurt she graduated as a teacher in 1973 and took her PhD in 1976 with a thesis on the History of German Social-Democracy in the 19th Century.

From 1976 to 1984 she taught at the Johann Wolfgang Goethe-University in Frankfurt (Germany).

From 1985 to 1987 she worked as a journalist in the Bonn office of the German news magazine Der Spiegel.

Today Cora Stephan lives in Mücke near Frankfurt (Germany) and Laurac-en-Vivarais (France). Under the pseudonym Anne Chaplet she was awarded the Deutscher Krimi Preis twice (in 2001 and 2004) and received Radio Bremen Krimipreis in 2003.

Books

Essays by Cora Stephan
 1992 Wir Kollaborateure
 1993 Der Betroffenheitskult
 1995 Neue deutsche Etikette
 1998 Das Handwerk des Krieges

Novels by Anne Chaplet
 1998 Caruso singt nicht mehr
 1999 Wasser zu Wein
 2000 Nichts als die Wahrheit
 2002 Die Fotografin
 2003 Schneesterben
 2004 Russisch Blut
 2006 Sauberer Abgang
 2007 Doppelte Schuld
 2008 Schrei nach Stille

External links

Websites in German 
 Cora Stephan contains articles by Cora Stephan, a short autobiography and a bibliography
 Anne Chaplet contains, amongst other useful information, a detailed bibliography and numerous photos

German crime writers
Living people
1951 births
Writers from Osnabrück
Academic staff of Goethe University Frankfurt
Der Spiegel people
Hessischer Rundfunk people